Tabataba suivi de pawana is the title of two short stories "Tabataba" followed by Pawana(Awaité Pawana)in one book written in French by French Nobel laureate J. M. G. Le Clézio ."Tabataba" was written by Bernard-Marie Koltès and  Hector Poullet.

Plot summary
Hector Poullet says that even if we choose the Creole expressions which are basically from Creole of the archipelago  of Guadeloupe, we do not always find the right translation in other varieties of Creole.[Other territories such as]:
 Martinique
 Guyana
 Dominica
 St. Lucia
have their own creole languages which each have their own words that need to be drawn into the story to help retelling.

Publication history

First French Edition

Theater
"Tabataba" was originally written for the stage by Bernard-Marie Koltès and was published by  Koltes Edicion Conmemorativa, 1996.

References

Works by J. M. G. Le Clézio